The Commander of the Lesotho Defence Force is the professional head of the Defence Force. He is responsible for the administration and the operational control of the Lesotho military.

List of chiefs

References

Military of Lesotho
Lesotho